The 2015 Copa do Brasil Third Round will be played from 20 May to 22 July 2015 to decide the 10 teams advancing to the knockout rounds. Different than the first two rounds, in this round the away team that wins the first match by 2 or more goals do not progress straight to the next round avoiding the second leg. The order of the matches was determined by a random draw. This phase had a pause during the 2015 Copa América.

Third round

|}

Match 61

Palmeiras won 1–0 on aggregate.

Match 62

Figueirense won 3–2 on aggregate.

Match 63

Santos won 4-3 on aggregate.

Match 64

Flamengo won 3-1 on aggregate.

Match 65

Tied 3–3 on aggregate, Ituano won on away goals.

Match 66

Tied 3-3 on aggregate, Coritiba won on penalties.

Match 67

Vasco won 6-3 on aggregate.

Match 68

Ceará won 2-1 on aggregate.

Match 69

Tied 1-1 on aggregate, Grêmio won on penalties.

Match 70

Paysandu won 3-2 on aggregate.

Notes

References

3